"Did Anyone Approach You?" is a song by the Norwegian band A-ha. It was the third single to be taken from their 2002 album Lifelines. It was recorded at The Alabaster Room in New York City sometime between June 2001 and January 2002.

Track listing
 "Did Anyone Approach You? (Original Album Version)" (4:11)
 "Did Anyone Approach You? (Turner Remix)" (3:43)
 "Did Anyone Approach You? (Reamped)" (4:51)
 "Did Anyone Approach You? (Tore Johansson Remix)" (5:55)
 "Afternoon High (Demo Version)" (4:40)
 "Did Anyone Approach You? (Video Clip)" (4:11)

Video
The video was filmed by Lauren Savoy, the wife of A-ha guitarist Paul Waaktaar-Savoy. It was shot at Ullevaal Stadion on 6 June 2002, the first concert on the band's Lifelines tour.

Charts

References

2002 singles
A-ha songs
Songs written by Paul Waaktaar-Savoy
Warner Music Group singles
2002 songs